Richard Lawrence O'Donnell (July 31, 1900 – January 19, 1947) was an American football player. He played most of his nine-year career with the Green Bay Packers. O'Donnell played college football for the Minnesota Golden Gophers

External links
NFL.com player page

References

1900 births
1947 deaths
American football wide receivers
American football halfbacks
Minnesota Golden Gophers football players
Duluth Kelleys players
Green Bay Packers players
Brooklyn Dodgers (NFL) players
Players of American football from Duluth, Minnesota